Messier 67 (also known as M67 or NGC 2682) and sometimes called the King Cobra cluster or the Golden Eye cluster is an open cluster in the southern, equatorial half of Cancer. It was discovered by Johann Gottfried Koehler in 1779. Estimates of its age range between 3.2 and 5 billion years. Estimates of 855, 840, and 815 pc were established via binary star modelling and infrared color-magnitude diagram fitting.

Description
M67 is not the oldest known open cluster, but there are few Milky Way clusters known to be older, and none of those is closer than M67.  It is a paradigm study object in stellar evolution:
 it is well-populated
 has negligible amounts of dust obscuration
 all its stars are at the same distance and age, save for approximately 30 anomalous blue stragglers

M67 is one of the most-studied open clusters, yet estimates of its physical parameters such as age, mass, and number of stars of a given type, vary substantially.  Richer et al. estimate its age to be 4 billion years, its mass to be 1080 solar masses, and number its white dwarfs at 150. Hurley et al. estimate its current mass to be  and its initial mass to be approximately 10 times as great.

It has more than 100 stars similar to the Sun, and numerous red giants.  The total star count has been estimated at well over 500.  The ages and prevalence of Sun-like stars had led some astronomers to theorize it as the possible parent cluster of the Sun. However, computer simulations have suggested that this is highly unlikely.

The cluster contains no main sequence stars bluer (hotter) than spectral type F, other than perhaps some of the blue stragglers, since the brighter stars of that age have already left the main sequence.  In fact, when the stars of the cluster are plotted on the Hertzsprung-Russell diagram, there is a distinct "turn-off" representing the stars which have terminated hydrogen fusion in the core and are destined to become red giants.  As a cluster ages, the turn-off moves progressively down the main sequence to cooler stars.

It appears that M67 has a bias toward heavier stars. One cause of this is mass segregation, the process by which lighter stars gain speed at the expense of more massive stars during close encounters, which moves them to greater average distance from the center of the cluster or allows escape altogether.

A March 2016 joint AIP/JHU study by Barnes et al. on rotational periods of 20 Sun-like stars, measured by the effects of moving starspots on light curves, suggests that these approximately 4 billion-year old stars spin in about 26 days – like the Sun, which has a period at the equator of 25.38 days. Measurements were carried out as part of the extended K2 mission of Kepler space telescope. This reinforces the applicability of many key properties of the sun to stars of the same size and age, a fundamental principle of modern solar and stellar physics. The authors abbreviate this as the "solar-stellar connection".

Gallery

See also
 List of Messier objects
 List of open clusters
 Open cluster family
 Open cluster remnant

References

External links
 
 Messier 67, SEDS Messier pages
 
 

Messier 067
Messier 067
067
Messier 067
Orion–Cygnus Arm
Astronomical objects discovered in 1779